Erastus Dalson Telford (April 23, 1874 – December 4, 1936) was an American politician and lawyer.

Biography
Telford was born near Salem, Illinois and graduated from Salem High School. He graduated from McKendree University and Georgetown University Law Center. He was admitted to the Illinois bar and practiced law in Salem. Teford served as the Salem city attorney. Telford served in the United States Army during World War I and was commissioned a major. Telford served in the Illinois Senate in 1911 and 1912 and from 1921 to 1929. He was a Republican. Teford died at Gliden Memorial Hospital in DeKalb, Illinois from an infection he suffered after fracturing his leg in an automobile accident near Vandalia, Illinois on October 25, 1936.

References

External links

1874 births
1936 deaths
People from Salem, Illinois
Military personnel from Illinois
McKendree University alumni
Georgetown University Law Center alumni
Illinois lawyers
Republican Party Illinois state senators
Road incident deaths in Illinois